María Denis (22 November 1916 – 15 April 2004) was an Argentine-born actress in Italian made films. Denis moved to Italy in 1932 when she was 16, and appeared in her first film there the same year. Denis became a top Italian star between 1936 and 1942 playing girl next door characters. Denis later appeared in films in several other countries. In 1949 she appeared in the British film Private Angelo.

Her younger sister Michela Belmonte was also an actress.

Selected filmography 

 What Scoundrels Men Are! (1932) - (uncredited)
 The Telephone Operator (1932) - (uncredited)
 Non c'è bisogno di denaro (1933) - Caterina
 1860 (1933) - Clelia
 My Little One (1933) - La ragazza nel bar all'aperto
 Tourist Train (1933) - Maria
 L'impiegata di papà (1933) - Collega
 Villafranca (1934)
 Seconda B (1934) - Marta Renzi
 The Matchmaker (1934)
 La mia vita sei tu (1934) - La graziosa ragazza
 Mr. Desire (1934)
 Creatures of the Night (1934) - L'altra ragazza
 Together in the Dark (1935) - Manicure
 Lorenzino de' Medici (1935) - Nella
 The Joker King (1936) - Fanya
 God's Will Be Done (1936) - Anna
 Joe the Red (1936) - Marietta Clavel
 King of Diamonds (1936) - Lola
 The Countess of Parma (1937) - Adriana
 Lasciate ogni speranza (1937) - La figlia Gina
 The Two Misanthropists (1937) - Betty
 Naples of Olden Times (1938) - Ninetta
 Ballerine (1938)
 Departure (1938) - Anna Diana
 They've Kidnapped a Man (1938) - L'amichetta del attore
 Who Are You? (1939) - Francesca
 Pretty or Plain They All Get Married (1939) - Marcella
 The Document (1939) - La contessina Luisa Sabelli
 Two on a Vacation (1940) - Liliana Casali
 The Last Enemy (1940) - Anna Vitali
 The Two Mothers (1940) - Agatina
 Fortuna (1940) - La figlia del direttore del giornale
 The Siege of the Alcazar (1940) - Conchita Alvarez
 Abandonment (1940) - Maria, sua sorella
 Goodbye Youth (1940) - Dorina
 La compagnia della teppa (1941) - Ada Mellario
 L'amore canta (1941) - Vera
 Yes, Madam (1942) - Cristina Zunino
 I sette peccati (1942) - Isa Sturmer
 The Two Orphans (1942) - Luisa
 La maestrina (1942) - Maria Bini, la maestrina
 Canal grande (1943) - Lisa
 Responsibility Comes Back (1945) - Anna Bortone
 La Vie de Bohème (1945) - Mimi / Mimì
 Malìa (1946) - Nedda, sorella di Jana
 Crime News (1947)
 Nada (1947) - Ena Berenguer
 Four Women (1947) - Blanca / Elena / Lola / Marta
 The Dance of Death (1948) - Rita
 Private Angelo (1949) - Lucrezia
 The Flame That Will Not Die (1949) - Maria
 A Slice of Life (1954) - La signora (segment "Scusi ma...") (final film role)

References

Bibliography 
 Reich, Jacqueline & Garofalo, Piero. Re-viewing Fascism: Italian Cinema, 1922-1943. Indiana University Press, 2002.

External links 
 

1916 births
2004 deaths
Argentine film actresses

People from Buenos Aires
20th-century Argentine actresses

Argentine expatriates in Italy